The Jim Thorpe Award, named in memory of multi-sport athlete Jim Thorpe, has been awarded to the top defensive back in college football since 1986. It is voted on by the Oklahoma Sports Hall of Fame.  In 2017, the award became sponsored by Paycom and was named the Paycom Jim Thorpe Award.

Winners

† In 1996, finalist Chris Canty of Kansas State University withdrew his name from consideration, which caused a re-vote.

References

General
 

Footnotes

External links
 

College football national player awards
Awards established in 1986